Frändefors IF is a Swedish football club located in Frändefors

History
The story begins in 1922 when the two football teams "Töva" and "Dykällan", two teams on the "good old" days, merge. The newly association's chairman was Oskar Berg Blom. Other board members from its inception were: Bertil Berggren, Secretary, Hilding Sundberg, Anders Larsson and Erik Zachrisson. Frändefors IF was one of the four teams who were in the so-called America's Cup in the 1950s. It was a series that jeweler Ossian Nordling, grew up next to the Binäs, introduced. He lived now in America and wanted to introduce a cup for teams around where he grew up - Binäs. The price was one that ELA type in a number from 1953. "TERRIFIC fleet trophy." Besides Frändefors also participated BK Lane, Lane IFK and IK Columbia originating in Sivikan, all clubs in the area around the Binäs. Frändefors won the Cup the same year as old Frändefors stadium North Skogsvallen was re-opened, in 1955. The finals were played between Frändefors and IK Columbia, where Frändefors won a 4 - 2

In recent years, it is mainly boys' and junior teams shown the way, except when the A-team -97 took back his place in division 4. 1989 Frändefors 16-year teams in the boys' headlines and did very well. In a match played among other 2-2 against himself IFK Göteborg, when Erik Carlsson and Andreas Eriksson made his goals.
Youth team in 1995 and 1998 with the Gothia Cup and did well both times. -95 Reached the quarterfinals of the B-finals. -98, However, gave the best results with the quarterfinals of the A-finals, after including beating two very good teams one from Norway and one from the United States.

Frendevi IP
1971 inaugurated Frändefors new stadium Frendevi. Festivities continued throughout the day and evening, and one of the highlights was when the governor Gunnar von Sydow officially inaugurated the new stadium. Opening started with standing gymnastics display and a 1000-meter race on the program. Moreover, was played a match between Frändefors representative team -71 and Borgens IL from Sarpsborg, a match that ended with a Norwegian victory, 7-4. Unfortunately, it was not the weather on Frändefors side that day, and it also appeared on the "new" plan afterwards.

Squad

Current squad

PLAYERS IN 

 2018

PLAYERS OUT 

2018

Official Site Frändefors IF

Season to season

 League restructuring in 1987 resulted in a new division being created at 3rd level called division 2 and subsequent divisions dropping a level.
 League restructuring in 2006 resulted in a new division being created at Tier 3 and subsequent divisions dropping a level.

Achievements

References

External links
Official Site
Dalsland FF Site

Football clubs in Västra Götaland County